So Fine is a studio album by Ike & Tina Turner released on Pompeii Records in 1968.

Content and release 
So Fine was the first album released on the Pompeii label. It features a remake of Ike and Tina's debut single "A Fool in Love". The duo also cover "Shake a Tail Feather" by The Five Du-Tones and "So Fine" by Johnny Otis. Three songs on the album "Bet'cha Can't Kiss Me (Just One Time)", "It Sho Ain't Me", and "Too Hot to Hold" were written by Mack Rice.

Of the five singles released from the album only "So Fine" charted. Released by the Pompeii subsidiary, Innis Records, it reached No. 50 on the Billboard R&B Singles chart and No. 117 on Bubbling Under The Hot 100 in 1968.

Critical reception 
Billboard (July 13, 1968): "This exciting fare, for Ike and Tina know how to infuse their soul performances with drive and spirit. In addition to the title song, "So Fine", there are "You're So Fine", the classic "Ain't Nobody's Business", "We Need an Understanding", and others. The [background vocals] are by the Ikettes.

Cash Box (July 20, 1968): "Singing with zest and energy, Ike and Tina Turner render a solid set of potent ditties. Among the offerings, in addition to the title tune, are "Shake a Tail Feather", "Ain't Nobody's Business", and "A Fool in Love". The vital performance turned in by the duo augurs good things to come for this stirring package."

Record World (August 10, 1968): "This couple found a groove a few years back and they've been working it—like an endless gold lode—since then. Their new single 'We Need an Understanding' is here with other sizzling numbers. Could be a very big package."

Reissues 
So Fine was reissued as Too Hot to Hold by Pickwick/33 Records in 1974. It was also included on the 1974 double album The Great Album Of Ike And Tina Turner released by Disques Festival in France.

So Fine was digitally remastered and included in the 3-CD compilation The Complete Pompeii Recordings (1968–1969), released by Goldenlane in 2016.

Track listing

References 

1968 albums
Ike & Tina Turner albums
Albums produced by Ike Turner
Soul albums by American artists